Veresegyház is a town in Pest county, Hungary.

Location 

This village first appeared as Vesereghatz in maps made by Hungarian clerk Lazarus Secretarius between 1510 and 1520. The town lies in the  Gödöllő-Hills near Cserhát. The nearest neighbour is Szada.

Attractions 
Roman Catholic Church: Built in 1777 by Christoph Anton Migazzi in the style of Louis XVI.  
The parish buildings and monuments from the lake not far from the stone crosses, there are pedestals to Mary Magdalene and St. John the Evangelist.
Roman Catholic cemetery: in 1806 and 1849 with red marble headstones
Reformed Church: was built in 1786.
Bear and wolf shelters: On November 24, 1998 Central Europe's only bear shelter was opened, covering . There are wolves in the park as well.

Twin towns – sister cities

Veresegyház is twinned with:
 Atia (Corund), Romania
 Šahy, Slovakia  
 Schneeberg, Germany

Notable people
Zoltán Bánföldi, footballer
József Darányi, athlete
Zoltán Joó, painter
Zoltán Téglás, American-Hungarian singer, songwriter and producer
István Sipeki, footballer
Norbert Palásthy, footballer
István Kövesfalvi, footballer
Zoltán Bánföldi, footballer

Resources 
Lajos Horváth: Veresegyház. Local history and village plans. Veresegyház, 1977. 251 p.

External links 
 Street map 
 Documentary film about the city 
 Veresegyház Official Website
 Facebook page
 Website of the Roman Catholic Church
 Photos of Veresegyház

References 

Populated places in Pest County